Robert Stuart Gilchrist (born 1964) is an American diplomat who is the United States ambassador to Lithuania since 2019. He is a career Foreign Service Officer with the rank of minister counselor. He was appointed by President Donald Trump and confirmed by the United States Senate on December 20, 2019. Gilchrist was the fifth US ambassador from the LGBT community nominated to serve by the Trump administration.

Early life and education 

Gilchrist earned a Bachelor of Arts from Wake Forest University and a Master of Arts from the University of Virginia.

Career 

Gilchrist was director of the United States Department of State Operations Center, deputy chief of mission of the United States embassy in Sweden, deputy chief of mission of the United States embassy in Estonia, and the director of Nordic and Baltic Affairs in the State Department's Bureau of European and Eurasian Affairs.  Among his earlier assignments, he was deputy political counselor at the United States embassy in Iraq, chief of the political section of the United States embassy in Romania, and a special assistant in the Office of the deputy secretary of state.

United States ambassador to Lithuania 

On July 22, 2019, President Donald Trump announced his intent to nominate Gilchrist to be the United States ambassador to Lithuania. His nomination was sent to the Senate on August 1, 2019. Russian hostility was a central topic during his confirmation hearings. On December 19, 2019, his nomination was confirmed in the Senate by voice vote.  Gilchrist was the fifth LGBT ambassador confirmed under the Trump administration. He presented his credentials to Lithuanian President Gitanas Nausėda on February 4, 2020.

Personal life 
Gilchrist speaks Spanish, French, Estonian, and Romanian.

See also
Ambassadors of the United States
List of LGBT ambassadors of the United States
GLIFAA (Gays and Lesbians in Foreign Affairs Agencies)

References

1964 births
Living people
21st-century American diplomats
Ambassadors of the United States to Lithuania
Gay diplomats
LGBT ambassadors of the United States
United States Foreign Service personnel
University of Virginia alumni
Wake Forest University alumni